On November 7, 1978, the District of Columbia held an election for its non-voting House delegate representing the District of Columbia's at-large congressional district. The winner of the race was Walter E. Fauntroy (D), who won his fourth re-election. All elected members would serve in 96th United States Congress.

The delegate is elected for two-year terms, as are all other Representatives and Delegates minus the Resident Commissioner of Puerto Rico, who is elected to a four-year term.

Candidates 
Walter E. Fauntroy, a Democrat, sought re-election for his fifth term to the United States House of Representatives. Fauntroy was opposed in this election by Republican challenger Jackson R. Champion and Statehood Party candidate Gregory Rowe who received 12.02% and 4.04%, respectively.  This resulted in Fauntroy being elected with 79.59% of the vote.

Results

See also
 United States House of Representatives elections in the District of Columbia

References 

United States House
District of Columbia
1978